Venture capital financing is a type of funding by venture capital. It is private equity capital that can be provided at various stages or funding rounds. Common funding rounds include early-stage seed funding in high-potential, growth companies (startup companies) and growth funding (also referred to as series A). Funding is provided in the interest of generating a return on investment or ROI through an eventual exit through a share sale to an investment body, another trading company or to the general public via an Initial public offering (IPO).
Venture Capital can be made in four methods:
1) Equity Financing;
2) Conditional Loan;
3) Income Note; and
4) Participating Debenture.

Overview 
Starting a new venture or launching a new product in the market requires funding. There are several categories of financing possibilities depending on the scope of a venture. Smaller ventures sometimes rely on friends and family funding, loans, or crowd funding.

For more ambitious projects, some companies need more than what was mentioned above, some ventures have access to rare funding resources called angel investors. These are private investors who are using their own capital to finance a venture's need. The Harvard report by William R. Kerr, Josh Lerner, and Antoinette Schoar tables evidence that angel-funded startup companies are less likely to fail than companies that rely on other forms of initial financing. Apart from these investors, there are also venture capital firms (VC firms) who specialize in financing new ventures against a lucrative return.

More ambitious projects that need more substantial funding may turn to angel investors or angel groups - private investors who use their own capital to finance a venture's need, or venture capital (VC) companies that specialize in financing new ventures. Venture capital firms may also provide expertise the venture is lacking, such as legal, strategy, or marketing knowledge. This is particularly the case in the Corporate venture capital context where a startup can benefit from a corporation, for instance by capitalizing on the corporation's brand name.

Strategies 
An investment strategy defines in part the identity of a firm that engages in the provision of venture capital financing. It need be neither unitary nor unchanging. One strategy relates to the subject matter expertise of personnel at the funding firm; if the firm members have expertise in the transportation industry, their funding transportation startups would be a logical choice based on their understanding of the industry, while their funding of franchise restaurants, less so. Another strategy is to align with a set of known serial entrepreneurs who have a demonstrated success at establishing start-ups that accrue value and return on investment. An emerging strategy is one based on machine learning with a focus on likely investments with a high return on investment.

Process
There are five common stages of venture capital financing:

Pre-seed funding | Concept stage
Seed stage
Post-seed / pre-third stage | Bridge round
Third stage | Series A
Fourth stage | Series B
Pre-initial public offering (IPO) stage

The number and type of stages may be extended by the venture capital firm if it deems necessary; this is common. This may happen if the venture does not perform as expected due to bad management or market conditions (see: Dot com boom). The following schematics shown here are called the process data models. All activities that find place in the venture capital financing process are displayed at the left side of the model. Each box stands for a stage of the process and each stage has a number of activities. At the right side, there are concepts. Concepts are visible products/data gathered at each activity. This diagram is according to the modeling technique developed by Sjaak Brinkkemper of the University of Utrecht in the Netherlands.

Seed stage 

This is where the seed funding takes place. It is considered as the setup stage where a person or a venture approaches an angel investor or an investor in a venture capital firm for funding for their idea/product. During this stage, the person or venture has to convince the investor why the idea/product is worthwhile. The investor will investigate the technical and economical feasibility (feasibility study) of the idea. In some cases, there is some sort of prototype of the idea/product that is not fully developed or tested.

If the idea is not feasible at this stage, and the investor does not see any potential in the idea/product, the investor will not consider financing the idea. However, if the idea/product is not directly feasible, but part of the idea is worthy of further investigation, the investor may invest some time and money in it for further investigation.

Example 
A Dutch venture named High 5 Business Solution V.O.F. wants to develop a portal that allows companies to order lunch. To open this portal, the venture needs some financial resources, they also need marketeers and market researchers to investigate whether there is a market for their idea. To attract these financial and non-financial resources, the executives of the venture decide to approach ABN AMRO Bank to see if the bank is interested in their idea.

After a few meetings, the executives are successful in convincing the bank to take a look in the feasibility of the idea. ABN AMRO decides to involve their own experts for further investigation. After two weeks, the bank decides to invest. They come to an agreement and invest a small amount of money into the venture. The bank also decides to provide a small team of marketeers and market researchers and a supervisor. This is done to help the venture with the realization of their idea and to monitor the activities in the venture.

Risk 
At this stage, the risk of losing the investment is tremendously high, because there are so many uncertain factors. The market research may reveal that there is no demand for the product or service, or it may reveal that there are already established companies serving this demand. Research by J.C. Ruhnka and J.E. Young shows that the risk of the venture capital firm losing its investment is around 66.2% and the causation of major risk by stage of development is 72% . The Harvard report by William R. Kerr, Josh Lerner, and Antoinette Schoar, however, shows evidence that angel-funded startup companies are less likely to fail than companies that rely on other forms of initial financing.

Start-up stage

If the idea/product/process is qualified for further investigation and/or investment, the process will go to the second stage; this is also called the start-up stage. A business plan is presented by the attendant of the venture to the venture capital firm. A management team is being formed to run the venture. If the company has a board of directors, representatives from the venture capital firms will take seats at the board of directors.

While the organisation is being set up, the idea/product gets its form. The prototype is being developed and fully tested. In some cases, clients are being attracted for initial sales. The management-team establishes a feasible production line to produce the product. The venture capital firm monitors the feasibility of the product and the capability of the management-team from the board of directors.

To prove that the assumptions of the investors are correct about the investment, the venture capital firm wants to see the results of market research to see if there are sufficient consumers to buy their product (market size). They also want to create a realistic forecast of the investment needed to push the venture into the next stage. If at this stage, the venture capital firm is not satisfied about the progress or market research results, the venture capital firm may stop their funding and the venture will have to search for another investor(s). When there is dissatisfaction and it is related to management performance, the investor may recommend replacing all or part of the management team.

Example 
Now the venture has attracted an investor, the venture needs to satisfy the investor to invest further. To do that, the venture needs to provide the investor a clear business plan, idea realisation, and how the venture is planning to earn back the investment that is put into the venture, of course with a lucrative return. Together with the market researchers, provided by the investor, the venture has to determine how big the market is in their region. They have to find out who are the potential clients and if the market is big enough to realise the idea.

From market research, the venture realises that there are enough potential clients for their portal site. But there are no providers of lunches yet. To convince these providers, the venture decides to interview providers and try to convince them to join. With this knowledge, the venture can finish their business plan and determine a forecast of the revenue, the cost of developing and maintaining the site, and the profit the venture will earn in the following five years. After reviewing the business plan and consulting the person who monitors the venture activities, the investor decides that the idea is worth further development.

Risk 
At this stage, the risk of losing the investment is shrinking because the nature of any uncertainty is becoming clearer. The venture capital firm's risk of losing the investment has dropped to 53.0%. However, the causation of major risk becomes higher (75.8%), because the prototype was not fully developed and tested at the seed stage. The venture capital firm could have underestimated the risk involved, or the product and the purpose of the product could have changed during development.

Third stage

At this stage, we presume that the idea has been transformed into a product and is being produced and sold. This is the first encounter with the rest of the market, the competitors. The venture is trying to squeeze between the rest and it tries to get some market share from the competitors. This is one of the main goals at this stage. Another important point is the cost. The venture is trying to minimize their losses in order to reach the break-even. The management team has to handle this decisively. The venture capital firm monitors the management capability of the team. This consists of how the management team manages the development process of the product and how they react to competition.

If at this stage the management team is proven their capability of standing hold against the competition, the venture capital firm will probably give a go for the next stage. However, if the management team lacks in managing the company or does not succeed in competing with the competitors, the venture capital firm may suggest for restructuring of the management team and extend the stage by redoing the stage again. In case the venture is doing tremendously bad whether it is caused by the management team or from competition, the investor will cut the funding.

Example 
The portal site needs to be developed. (If possible, the development should be taken place in house. If not, the venture needs to find a reliable designer to develop the site.) Developing the site in house is not possible; the venture does not have this knowledge in house. The venture decides to consult this with the investor. After a few meetings, the investor decides to provide the venture a small team of web-designers. The investor also has given the venture a deadline when the portal should be operational. The deadline is in three months. In the meantime, the venture needs to produce a client portfolio, who will provide their menu at the launch of the portal site. The venture also needs to come to an agreement on how these providers are being promoted at the portal site and against what price.

After three months, the investor requests the status of development. Unfortunately for the venture, the development did not go as planned. The venture did not make the deadline. According to the one who is monitoring the activities, this is caused by the lack of decisiveness by the venture and the lack of skills of the designers. The investor decides to cut back their financial investment after a long meeting. The venture is given another three months to come up with an operational portal site. Three designers are being replaced by a new designer and a consultant is attracted to support the executives’ decisions. If the venture does not make this deadline in time, they have to find another investor. Luckily for the venture, with the come of the new designer and the consultant, the venture succeeds in making the deadline. They even have two weeks left before the second deadline ends.

Risk 
At this stage, the risk decreases because the start-up is no longer developing its product, but is now concentrating on promoting and selling it. These risks can be estimated. The risk to the venture capital firm of losing the investment drops from 53.0% to 33.7%, and the causation of major risk by stage of development also drops at this stage, from 75.8% to 53.0%.

Fourth stage

This stage is seen as the expansion/maturity phase of the previous stage. The venture tries to expand the market share they gained in the previous stage. This can be done by selling more of the product and having a good marketing campaign. Also, the venture will have to see whether it is possible to cut down their production cost or restructure the internal process. This can become more visible by doing a SWOT analysis. It is used to figure out the strength, weakness, opportunity and the threat the venture is facing and how to deal with it. Apart from expanding, the venture also starts to investigate follow-up products and services. In some cases, the venture also investigates how to expand the life-cycle of the existing product/service.

At this stage the venture capital firm monitors the objectives already mentioned in the second stage and also the new objective mentioned at this stage. The venture capital firm will evaluate if the management team has made the expected cost reduction. They will also examine how the venture competes against the competitors. The new developed follow-up product will be evaluated to determine its potential.

Example 
Finally, the portal site is operational. The portal is getting more orders from the working class every day. To keep this going, the venture needs to promote their portal site. The venture decides to advertise by distributing flyers at each office in their region to attract new clients. In the meanwhile, a small team is being assembled for sales, which will be responsible for getting new lunchrooms/bakeries, any eating-places in other cities or regions to join the portal site. This way the venture also works on expanding their market.

Because of the delay at the previous stage, the venture did not fulfil the expected target. From a new forecast, requested by the investor, the venture expects to fulfil the target in the next quarter or the next half year. This is caused by external issues the venture does not have control of it. The venture has already suggested to stabilise the existing market the venture already owns and to decrease the promotion by 20% of what the venture is spending at the moment. This is approved by the investor.

Risk 
At this stage, the risk to the venture capital firm of losing the investment drops from 20.1% to 13.6%, and the causation of major risk by stage of development drops substantially from 53.0% to 37.0%. However, new follow-up products are often being developed at this stage. The risk of losing the investment is still decreasing, because the venture relies on its income from sales of the existing product.

Bridge/pre-IPO stage

In general, this is the last stage of the venture capital financing process. The main goal of this stage is for the venture to go public so that investors can exit the venture with a profit commensurate with the risk they have taken.

At this stage, the venture achieves a certain amount of market share. This gives the venture some opportunities, for example:
 Merger with other companies
 Keeping new competitors away from the market
 Eliminate competitors

Internally, the venture has to examine the product's market position and, if possible, reposition it to attract new Market segmentation. This is also the phase to introduce the follow-up product/services to attract new clients and markets. Ventures have occasionally made a very successful initial market impact and been able to move from the third stage directly to the exit stage. In these cases, however, it is unlikely that they will achieve the benchmarks set by the venture capital firm.

Example 
Faced with the dilemma of whether to continuously invest or not. The causation of major risk by this stage of development is 33%. This is caused by the follow-up product that is introduced.

Total risk
As mentioned in the first paragraph, a venture capital firm is not only about funding and lucrative returns, but it also offers knowledge support. Also, as can be seen below, the amount of risk (of losing investment value) decreases with each additional funding stage

History
In July 2016, the Financial Post reported that according to a report by PricewaterhouseCoopers and the National Venture Capital Association, venture-capital funding in Silicon Valley fell 20% in the second quarter from a year earlier.

See also
Corporate venture capital
Market research
Market segmentation
Revenue based financing
Pricing
SWORD-financing
Venture capital
Cap Tables

References

Further reading 
 Ruhnka, J.C., Young, J.E. (1987). "A venture capital model of the development process for new ventures". In: Journal of business venturing. Volume: 2, Issue: 2 (Spring 1987), pp. 167–184.
 Ruhnka, Tyzoon T. Tyebjee, Albert V. Bruno (1984). "A Model of Venture Capitalist Investment Activity". In: Management science. Volume: 30, Issue: 9 (September 1984), pp. 1051–1066.
 Frederick D. Lipman (1998). "Financing Your Business with Venture Capital: Strategies to Grow Your Enterprise with Outside Investors". In: Prima Lifestyles; 1st edition (November 15, 1998).

Venture capital